The MAX Red Line is a light rail service in Portland, Oregon, United States, operated by TriMet as part of the MAX Light Rail system. An airport rail link, it runs from central Beaverton to Portland International Airport via Northeast Portland and Portland City Center. The Red Line serves 26 stations; it interlines with the Blue Line and partially with the Green Line from Beaverton Transit Center to Gateway/Northeast 99th Avenue Transit Center and then operates a  segment through to Portland International Airport station. Service runs for 22 hours per day with a headway of 15 minutes during most of the day. The Red Line is the second-busiest service in the MAX system with an average 10,310 passengers per weekday in September 2021.

Plans for an airport light rail service surfaced in the 1980s, and efforts were accelerated following Portland International Airport's rapid expansion in the 1990s. Conceived from an unsolicited proposal by engineering company Bechtel in 1997, the Airport MAX project was designed and built under a public–private partnership between a consortium of Bechtel and Trammell Crow, the Port of Portland, and local governments. Construction began in 1999, and it was completed in under two years due to the use of local and private financing and existing public right-of-way. The Red Line began operating between the airport and downtown Portland on September 10, 2001. Amid strong westside ridership on the Blue Line, Red Line service was extended west along existing tracks to Beaverton Transit Center in 2003. Track improvements and a service extension farther west to Fair Complex/Hillsboro Airport station in Hillsboro are scheduled for completion in 2024.

History

Background and partnership agreement

In 1975, as construction of the Interstate 205 (I-205) freeway progressed north to Multnomah County, local leaders negotiated reducing the number of car lanes along a  section and including a separated transit bus right-of-way; partially realized as the I-205 busway, the transit right-of-way was built but was never utilized by buses. In 1985, the Portland metropolitan area's regional government, Metro, began a study for light rail along the I-205 corridor at the behest of the Port of Portland and Clackamas County, who had wanted a line running from Portland International Airport to Clackamas Town Center and connecting with the nearly completed Portland–Gresham Metropolitan Area Express (MAX) using the I-205 busway right-of-way. Despite initially recommending the I-205 light rail line's construction by 1995, in October 1987, Metro's Joint Policy Advisory Committee on Transportation (JPACT) formally identified the Westside Corridor between downtown Portland and Washington County as the "next priority corridor for major investment". Leaders from Metro and Portland's regional transit agency, TriMet, then called on local governments and businesses in Clackamas County to pursue alternative sources of funding, and a dispute between Washington and Clackamas county officials followed after the latter persisted requesting a share of the regional funds. As a compromise, Metro published a transit plan in 1989 that reasserted the Westside Corridor's priority and commissioned preliminary work for the I-205 proposal.

In April 1991, the Port approved a master plan for Portland International Airport, a 20-year, $300 million phased expansion of the passenger terminal, to serve predicted passenger traffic growth through 2010. The plan included a long-term goal for an extension of light rail to the airport and thus reserved space for a light rail station near the southern end of the terminal's arrivals hall and baggage claim area. By 1993, the airport had already served 8.5 million passengers, an annual growth rate of 18 percent, which far exceeded what the Port had projected for the year 1997. Meanwhile, environmental studies conducted in the early 1990s caused Metro planners to shift plans away from the I-205 corridor in favor of a north–south route farther west and closer to downtown Portland between Hazel Dell, Washington and Clackamas Town Center, which was ultimately adopted and called the "South/North Corridor". Voters rejected local funding proposals for the South/North project in 1995 and 1996. Seeking alternative sources, Metro, among other proposals, proposed combining the project with a locally and privately funded airport light rail extension; this would in turn allow Metro to ask for more federal funds to match the overall project. TriMet later opted to ask Portland-area voters to provide local funding instead, who declined through a 1998 ballot measure.

Meanwhile, engineering firm Bechtel, wanting to acquire property near the airport, had by then initiated discussions with the Port regarding the feasibility of an airport light rail line and assigned a former Federal Transit Administration (FTA) employee to help develop a plan. The Port expressed its support of Bechtel's unsolicited proposal in January 1997, and a preliminary engineering study commenced that December. After long deliberations, agreements were made between Bechtel, the Port, TriMet, and local governments and agencies in October 1998. Bechtel later developed this property and renamed it Cascade Station. The following month, the Associated Builders and Contractors filed a petition in Multnomah County Circuit Court claiming that the contract awarded to Bechtel may have violated Oregon procurement laws. The court ruled in favor of TriMet with the judge declaring that the contract was awarded fairly.

Funding and construction

TriMet projected the Airport MAX extension to cost $125 million. Additional costs to purchase train sets and build related infrastructure raised this total to $182.7 million. The project was accelerated with the establishment of a public–private partnership, which excluded FTA funding and thus eliminated a requirement for FTA approval. Under U.S. federal regulations, the Port was able to fund only the  portion of the project located within airport property with authorization from the Federal Aviation Administration (FAA). To ensure funding for the entire project, the Port divided financing into three parts. The Port assumed responsibility for the segment within its property. The next  of track, which ran through Cascade Station, went to private funding. The final  along I-205 was covered by TriMet, Metro, and the City of Portland.

The Port contributed $28.3 million for construction and $20 million for terminal and road improvements; this was drawn from a $3 ticket fee paid by travelers. Delta Airlines, Reno Air, and United Airlines argued that the extension would serve few airline passengers and opposed the use of ticket fees, but the FAA approved it in May 1999. Cascade Station Development, a private consortium of Bechtel and real estate developer Trammell Crow, provided $28.2 million for the project and $13.1 million for the construction of an interchange over I-205 and Airport Way. TriMet released $27.5 million for construction, which was funded by $30 million in bonds, and procured six new rail cars for $6 million each. Metro allocated $18 million from a regional transportation fund, while $23 million came from tax increment bonds issued by the City of Portland.

David Evans and Associates served as the prime engineer and lead designer. Much of the Airport MAX used public right-of-way owned either by the Oregon Department of Transportation, the Port, or TriMet; this avoided displacing other property owners. The project limited its impact only to parking spaces at Gateway Transit Center and along Airport Way. Bechtel began construction in June 1999 on a segment next to I-205 near the Columbia Slough. Bridgework over the freeway commenced the following December. To minimize lane closures, workers used a cast-in-place concrete pouring method to extend the bridges' spans in  increments. Work progressed quickly along the freeway segment due to the existing I-205 busway alignment, which included a tunnel from Gateway Transit Center to the freeway median. Bechtel contracted track installation to Stacy and Witbeck. To meet the project's deadline, workers placed  of rail per day; tracks from Gateway Transit Center to the bridge over southbound I-205 were laid by July 2000. Hoffman Construction built the $8.4 million Portland International Airport station, and local architecture firm Zimmer Gunsul Frasca (ZGF) designed the station's glass-roofed shelter to complement the airport terminal's drop-off canopy, which ZGF also designed. Bechtel began the end-to-end testing of the power, trains, and signals in March 2001. TriMet took over the project that July to continue system testing and verify scheduling.

Opening and extension to Beaverton

In 2000, TriMet named the new MAX service to the airport the "Red Line" to differentiate it from the established service between Hillsboro and Gresham, which it renamed the "Blue Line". The Airport MAX extension opened on September 10, 2001. Celebrations scheduled for September 15–16 were canceled in the aftermath of the September 11 attacks, with the airport itself closed for three days due to a nationwide ground stop. Upon opening, the Red Line operated from the airport to the Library and Galleria stations in downtown Portland, where its trains turned around at the 11th Avenue loop tracks. It replaced bus route 12–Sandy Boulevard as TriMet's only service to and from the airport. C-Tran moved its bus service from Vancouver, Washington from its connection at Gateway Transit Center to Parkrose/Sumner Transit Center. Although tested during trial runs, TriMet opted to omit luggage racks from Red Line trains to maximize rider capacity. By November 2001, ridership averaged 2,300 riders and peaked at 3,800 riders a day before Thanksgiving holiday weekend. At that point, service had been using single light rail cars, but the influx of riders prompted TriMet to temporarily deploy two-car consists, which it had not planned to do until 2006.

On September 1, 2003, TriMet extended Red Line service farther west using the existing Westside MAX tracks to Beaverton Transit Center. This was done in an effort to  increase capacity between Gateway Transit Center and Beaverton, and to provide a one-seat ride to the airport for westside riders. Regular use of two-car trains on the line began in September 2005, when overcrowding prompted TriMet to change most Yellow Line service from two-car consists to single cars in order to convert the Red Line to two-car trains.

Track improvements and extension to Hillsboro

In October 2017, TriMet, citing system-wide delays caused by the single-track segments along the Airport MAX, announced the MAX Red Line Improvements Project, later renamed "A Better Red". The project proposed adding a second track to existing single-track segments between Gateway Transit Center and Portland International Airport station to allow trains to pass one another. To qualify for federal funding, TriMet included extending Red Line service farther west along existing Westside MAX tracks from Beaverton Transit Center to Fair Complex/Hillsboro Airport station in Hillsboro and creating a one-seat option from ten existing stations to Portland International Airport. Preliminary design work began in February 2018. TriMet adopted a locally preferred alternative in April 2019 and submitted the plan to the FTA to request funding. In May 2020, the FTA announced $99.99 million for the project through the Capital Investment Grants program. Final design was completed by engineering firm Parametrix in early 2021. The design includes two new bridges north of Gateway Transit Center to accommodate the second track and a new MAX platform called "Gateway North". TriMet received the FTA grant and broke ground on September 29, 2021.

From April 2–9, 2022, Red Line service was suspended to make way for construction, and shuttle buses operated between Gateway Transit Center and Portland International Airport. The project is expected to be completed in 2024.

Route

The extension begins just south of Gateway Transit Center where it branches from the Eastside MAX segment, makes a 180-degree loop, and heads north along the east side of I-205. Near Rocky Butte, it enters a tunnel beneath the northbound lanes of the freeway and emerges along the median. Just south of the Columbia Slough, the route crosses over the southbound lanes as I-205 towards Cascade Station and proceeds northwest along the south side of Cascade Parkway. It follows this road then crosses it just before Mount Hood Avenue station. The line continues northwest along the south side of Airport Way until it reaches its terminus at Portland International Airport station. Beyond the Airport MAX, Red Line trains serve parts of the Westside and Eastside MAX segments; it interlines with the Blue Line from Beaverton Transit Center to Gateway Transit Center and the Green Line from Rose Quarter Transit Center to Gateway Transit Center.

Although much of the Red Line runs along a double-track railway, two segments of the Airport MAX extension are single-tracked. The first segment starts near Gateway Transit Center and ends just north of Northeast Halsey Street. The other segment runs from south of the Northeast Airport Way and Northeast Airport Way Frontage Road intersection to just before the airport terminus. TriMet is adding a second track to both segments by 2024 as part of the A Better Red project.

Stations

The Airport MAX extension consists of four stations; from north to south they are: Portland International Airport, Mount Hood Avenue, and Parkrose/Sumner Transit Center. Red Line service runs from Portland International Airport station to Beaverton Transit Center, a total of 26 stations. The Red Line interlines with the Blue and Green lines along the Eastside and Westside MAX segments; it shares 22 stations, from Beaverton Transit Center to Gateway Transit Center, with the Blue Line, of which eight stations, from Rose Quarter Transit Center to Gateway Transit Center, are additionally shared with the Green Line. Transfers to the Green (beyond the interline segment), Orange, and Yellow lines, via the Pioneer Courthouse and Pioneer Place stations along the Portland Transit Mall, can be made by detraining at the Pioneer Square stations. Another transfer to the Yellow Line, via Interstate/Rose Quarter station, can be made at Rose Quarter Transit Center. The Red Line also provides connections to local and intercity bus services at various stops across the line, the Portland Streetcar at four stops within Portland's Central City, and WES Commuter Rail at Beaverton Transit Center. A Better Red will extend Red Line service to Fair Complex/Hillsboro Airport station in 2024 using the existing Westside MAX alignment, as well as construct an infill station north of Gateway Transit Center called "Gateway North".

Service

TriMet designates the Red Line as a "Frequent Service" route; its trains operate for approximately 22 hours per day with headways ranging from 30 minutes during the early mornings and late evenings to as frequently as 15 minutes for most of the day. Each day, the first train begins service at approximately 3:30 am going eastbound from Beaverton Transit Center to Portland International Airport station. Travel between the termini takes approximately 65 minutes and the first westbound service departs Portland International Airport station at approximately 4:55 am. In the evenings, select westbound trains travel beyond the line's terminus at Beaverton Transit Center to Hatfield Government Center station in Hillsboro; these trains operate as through services of the Blue Line upon arriving at Gateway/Northeast 99th Avenue Transit Center. The Red Line's last three trips turn into eastbound Blue Line trains at Gateway Transit Center and terminate at Ruby Junction/East 197th Avenue station. The last westbound service departs from Portland International Airport station at approximately 12:30 am and the last Red Line service, which travels eastbound, departs from Portland International Airport station at approximately 1:40 am.

On September 2, 2018, TriMet reintroduced bus service to the airport, which had been replaced by the Red Line in 2001, with the 272–PDX Night Bus. The bus route ran in the late night and early morning hours when the Red Line was not operating. It was indefinitely suspended on April 5, 2020, amid the COVID-19 pandemic.

Ridership

The Red Line averaged 10,310 riders on weekdays in September 2021. Prior to the COVID-19 pandemic, which impacted public transit ridership globally, the Red Line was the second-busiest service on the MAX network, having averaged 22,530 weekday riders in September 2019. In September 2002, it averaged 2,800 daily riders at the airport, ahead of TriMet's first-year projections of 2,300. The line's extension to Beaverton Transit Center in 2003 increased weekday ridership by 49 percent along the westside corridor and six percent systemwide. IKEA's opening in July 2007 helped to attract more riders to Cascade Station, which had been considered a failed planned development amid the economic recession that followed the September 11 attacks. In 2008, Cascades station recorded an eight-fold increase in traffic, from 250 passengers per week to 2,000; this number increased to 6,000 by 2010. The Red Line's yearly ridership peaked at just over nine million passengers in 2009; it has continued to fall as part of a system-wide decline attributed to crime and rising housing costs in the Portland area. From 8.2 million boardings in 2012, 7.4 million boardings were recorded in 2015.

Explanatory notes

References

External links

 

 
2001 establishments in Oregon
Portland
Red Line
Rail lines in Oregon
Railway lines opened in 2001
Railway lines in highway medians